David Livingstone Crawford (born 1931) is an American astronomer.

Crawford has a doctorate in astronomy from the University of Chicago and worked most of his scientific career at Kitt Peak National Observatory in Tucson, Arizona, and the National Optical Astronomical Observatories, where he is emeritus astronomer. He co-founded the International Dark-Sky Association with Tim Hunter in 1988. He won the 2010 Clifford W. Holmes Award for popularizing astronomy.

Asteroid (7327) Crawford is named after him.

References
Dr. David L. Crawford , 2005 G. Bruce Blair Award, Western Amateur Astronomers

1931 births
Living people
University of Chicago alumni
American astronomers